Élisabeth of France (1764–1794) was the daughter of Louis, Dauphin of France and Marie-Josèphe of Saxony, and sister of Louis XVI.

Elisabeth of France may also refer to:
 Elisabeth of France (1545–1568) or Elisabeth of Valois, daughter of Henry II of France and Catherine de' Medici, and wife of Philip II of Spain
 Elisabeth of France (1602–1644), daughter of Henry IV of France and Marie de' Medici, and wife of Philip IV of Spain